Bettinelli may refer to:

Andrea Bettinelli (born 1978), Italian high jumper
Bruno Bettinelli (1913–2004), Italian composer
Marcus Bettinelli (born 1992), English football player
Mario Bettinelli (1880–1953), Italian painter
Matt Bettinelli-Olpin (born 1978), American actor
Saverio Bettinelli (1718–1808) Italian Jesuit writer